Charles Brownlow, 2nd Baron Lurgan KP (10 April 1831 – 15 January 1882), was an Anglo-Irish Liberal politician.

Lurgan was the son of Charles Brownlow, 1st Baron Lurgan, and his second wife Jane (née Macneill), and succeeded his father in the barony in 1847. He sat on the Liberal benches in the House of Lords and served as a Lord-in-waiting (government whip in the House of Lords) from 1869 to 1874 in the first Liberal administration of William Ewart Gladstone. Between 1864 and 1882 he also held the honorary post of Lord Lieutenant of Armagh. In 1864 he was made a Knight of the Order of St Patrick.

Lord Lurgan married the Hon. Emily Anne, daughter of John Browne, 3rd Baron Kilmaine, in 1853. He died in January 1882, aged only 50, and was succeeded in the barony by his son William. Lady Lurgan died in September 1929.

Lurgan was the owner of the famous greyhound Master McGrath.

Arms

References

Kidd, Charles, Williamson, David (editors). Debrett's Peerage and Baronetage (1990 edition). New York: St Martin's Press, 1990, 

1831 births
1882 deaths
Barons in the Peerage of the United Kingdom
Knights of St Patrick
Lord-Lieutenants of Armagh
Eldest sons of British hereditary barons
Charles